Articles on the modern history of Libya:
Tripolitania Vilayet (1864-1911)
History of Libya as Italian colony (1911-1943)
World War II and Allied occupation, see Libya during World War II
Kingdom of Libya (1951-1969)
Libya under Gaddafi (1969-present)